41 (forty-one) is the natural number following 40 and preceding 42.

In mathematics
 the 13th smallest prime number. The next is 43, making both twin primes.
 the sum of the first six prime numbers (2 + 3 + 5 + 7 + 11 + 13).
 the 12th supersingular prime
 a Newman–Shanks–Williams prime. 
 the smallest Sophie Germain prime to start a Cunningham chain of the first kind of three terms, {41, 83, 167}.
 an Eisenstein prime, with no imaginary part and real part of the form 3n − 1.
 a Proth prime as it is 5 × 23 + 1.
 the sum of two squares, 42 + 52.
 the sum of the sum of the divisors of the first 7 positive integers.
 the smallest integer whose reciprocal has a 5-digit repetend.  That is a consequence of the fact that 41 is a factor of 99999.
 the smallest integer whose square root has a continued fraction with period 3.
 a centered square number.
 a prime index prime, as 13 is prime.

In science
 The atomic number of niobium.

In astronomy
 Messier object M41, a magnitude 5.0 open cluster in the constellation Canis Major.
 The New General Catalogue object NGC 41, a spiral galaxy in the constellation Pegasus.

In music
 "#41", a song by Dave Matthews Band.
 "American Skin (41 Shots)" is a song by Bruce Springsteen about an immigrant murder victim who was shot at 41 times by the NYPD.

In film 
 The name of an independent documentary about Nicholas O'Neill, the youngest victim of the Station nightclub fire.
 2012 documentary on the life of the 41st President of the United States George H. W. Bush.

In other fields
 The international direct dialing (IDD) code for Switzerland.
 Bush 41, George H. W. Bush, the 41st President of the United States.
 In Mexico "cuarenta y uno" (41) is slang referring to a homosexual. This is due to the 1901 arrest of 41 homosexuals at a hotel in Mexico City during the government of Porfirio Díaz (1876–1911). See: Dance of the Forty-One
 Number of ballistic missile submarines of the George Washington class and its successors, collectively known as the "41 for Freedom".
 The 41st season of CBS's reality program Survivor is simply subtitled Survivor 41.
The percentage of transgender people who have attempted suicide at somepoint in their life. Written as "41%" and often used both as a synonym for suicide within transgender communities, and as general shorthand for transgender people in right-wing and alt-right online communities.

See also
 List of highways numbered 41

References

Integers